The World as It Is is a memoir by Ben Rhodes, a former White House staffer and longtime adviser to former U.S. President Barack Obama. The book was released by Random House on June 5, 2018. It includes a recounting of many important events during Obama's two terms as President. It also includes reactions of world leaders, including Obama and German Chancellor Angela Merkel, to the election of President Donald Trump as the 45th President of the United States.

References 

2018 non-fiction books
American memoirs
Books about Barack Obama
Books about Donald Trump
Books about Hillary Clinton
Books about the 2016 United States presidential election
Political memoirs
Random House books